Andrew Charles Winstone (born 16 March 1975) is a former English cricketer.  Winstone was a right-handed batsman who bowled right-arm off break.  He was born at Wells, Somerset. Andrew Winstone represented Somerset 2nd XI between 1991 and 1994 and Captained Somerset U19s.
Winstone represented the Sussex Cricket Board in a single List A match against Shropshire in the 2nd round of the 2001 Cheltenham & Gloucester Trophy at Horntye Park, Hastings.

References

External links
Andrew Winstone at Cricinfo
Andrew Winstone at CricketArchive

1975 births
Living people
People from Wells, Somerset
Cricketers from Somerset
English cricketers
Sussex Cricket Board cricketers